Virtanen or Wirtanen may refer to:

Virtanen (surname), a surname
46P/Wirtanen, a comet
1449 Virtanen, an asteroid
Virtanen (crater), a lunar crater
Virtanen, a cocktail with Koskenkorva Viina

See also
B. Virtanen, Finnish comic strip